Arthur Brown M.Inst. C.E. (21 November 1851 - 13 April 1935)  was City Engineer for Nottingham, England from 1880 to 1919.

Life
He was born on 21 November 1851 in Nottingham, the son of George Hutchinson Brown a Nottingham merchant. He was educated at Nottingham Grammar School.

On 13 March 1877 at All Saints' Church, Nottingham he married Caroline Goodwin (1854-1919), only daughter of T.A. Goodwin of Nottingham, and they had the following children:
Lieutenant Arthur Goodwin Brown M.T., A.S.C. (1878-1947) 
Lieutenant Ernest Victor Brown R.G.A. (b.1880) 
Ethel Carrie Brown (b. 1883)
Winifred M. Brown (1888-1918) (drowned in the sinking of a ship)

For many years he lived in Glenthorne, Lucknow Avenue, Nottingham. He died on 13 April 1935 and left an estate valued at £43,626.

Career
He was articled to the Borough Engineer Marriott Ogle Tarbotton becoming Assistant Borough Engineer in 1874, and succeeded to the role himself in 1880. He retired in 1919.

Works

Gregory Boulevard, Nottingham 1882-83 
Lenton Boulevard, Nottingham 1882-83
Radford Boulevard, Nottingham 1882-83
Beck Valley storm water culvert, St Ann's Well Road, Nottingham 1882-83
St Peter's Gate churchyard disinterments and improvements 1884
Cattle Market, London Road, Nottingham 1885
King Street and Queen Street, Nottingham 1890
Victoria Park, Nottingham 1894
Sneinton Baths, Nottingham 1895
Victoria Embankment, Nottingham 1898
Construction works for Nottingham Corporation Tramways 1900 onwards
Talbot Street power station extension 1900
St Ann's Well Road power station 1901-02 and extension 1919
Carrington Street bridge, 1904
Stoke and Bulcote Sewage Farm extension
Bridge over the Nottingham Canal, Trent Street
Bridge over the Nottingham Canal, Wilford Street
Milton Street, Nottingham (widening)
Bath Street, Nottingham (widening)
Manvers Street, Nottingham (widening)
Bulwell Forest Cricket Ground
Lenton recreation ground
Wilford Suspension Bridge Nottingham 1906
Street works depot, Church Street, Basford 1907-08
Goose Gate, Nottingham, (widening) 1911
Carlton Road, Nottingham (widening between Thorneywood Lane and the city boundary) 1913

References

1851 births
1935 deaths
British civil engineers
English civil engineers
People from Nottingham
People educated at Nottingham High School